The Swedes of Gammalsvenskby are descendents of the Swedish-speaking minority Estonian Swedes that resided on the Baltic sea island of Hiiumaa, and emigrated to Novorossiya in the 1780s where they founded Gammalsvenskby.

Genetics 
In 2017, saliva samples were collected from 25 people in Ukraine, and their descendants on the Swedish Baltic sea island of Gotland, in order to determine the genetic origin of the Swedish villagers in Gammalsvenskby in a DNA project led by genetics professor at Uppsala University. The preliminary results showed that the Swedish villagers were more genetically similar to Balts than other groups in Sweden.

See also 

 Estonian Swedes
 Swedish diaspora

References

External links 

 Svenskbyborna.se

Canadian
Ethnic groups in Ukraine